Money Creek is a stream in the U.S. state of Washington.

Money Creek was named for the fact money was invested in mines near the stream's course.

See also
List of rivers of Washington

References

Rivers of King County, Washington
Rivers of Washington (state)